Richard Hunt was Dean  of Durham from his installation on 29 May 1620 until his death on 2 November 1638.

Hunt was  educated at TrinityCollege, Cambridge. He was Vicar of Terrington from 1609 and a Prebendary of Canterbury  from 1614 to 1633. Later he  was the Rector of Foulsham and a Prebendary of Lichfield.

References

1638 deaths
Alumni of Trinity College, Cambridge
Deans of Durham
Year of birth unknown